The 2002 Amsterdam Admirals season was the eighth season for the franchise in the NFL Europe League (NFLEL). The team was led by head coach Bart Andrus in his second year, and played its home games at Amsterdam ArenA in Amsterdam, Netherlands. They finished the regular season in fifth place with a record of four wins and six losses.

Offseason

Free agent draft

Personnel

Staff

Roster

Schedule

Standings

Game summaries

Week 1: vs Rhein Fire

Statistics

Passing

Notes

References

Amsterdam
Amsterdam Admirals seasons